e3 Civic High is a free public charter high school serving grades 9 thru 12 located in the landmark 400,000 square foot downtown San Diego Public Library. The three "e's" represent and drive our mission to Engage, Educate, and Empower. Mission & Vision The mission of e3 Civic High is to engage, educate, and empower our learning community to be caring, passionate, life-long learners and civic leaders that are prepared for college, workforce, and life. College, Workforce, & Life. While the three e3's represent our core values and drives our mission, the 3 R's (reading, writing and arithmetic) drive academic college readiness while the 5 C's (Communication, Collaboration, Critical Thinking, Creativity, Civic Engagement) drive our Workforce and Life readiness. This is the "e3 Way". All e3 scholars have clear college, workforce, and life targets including academic, civic engagement, and internships to prepare them for life after high school. All scholars are offered academic and wellness supports as well as small class sizes. e3 supports all scholars to prepare for and take the PSAT, SAT, and apply to a 2-year college and 4-year universities.

History
The city of San Diego had been studying the possibility of a new central library for years, and a site had been identified, but funding was insufficient. In April 2010 the city and the school district reached an agreement to house a school in leased space within the library; the district's rent payments would help to make the new downtown library financially possible. The city approved construction plans for the library in June 2010. A petition for a new charter high school, initially referred to as Downtown Charter High, was submitted to the San Diego Unified School District in September 2010. Several other charter petitions were also filed, but the school district chose Downtown Charter and approved the application in August 2011. The name was later changed to e3 Civic High (for "engage, educate, empower").

The new library and the school both opened in September 2013. The initial enrollment consisted of 260 students in the 9th and 10th grades. Additional 9th graders were added in 2014 and 2015; as of the 2015–16 school year the enrollment is 403, with a target total enrollment of approximately 500 students. The first senior class graduated in June 2016.

School operation
The school is open to all high school students in San Diego County. Students must submit an application to attend. If more applications are received than there are available slots, students are accepted by lottery, with preference given to students from within the school district and particularly those whose neighborhood high school is identified as underperforming.

The school design includes variably sized rooms and open spaces. Most of the rooms have modular glass walls and movable furniture intended to facilitate collaboration among students and between students and teachers. It is described as looking "more like a Starbucks and less like a school." Library patrons can see inside the school, though they cannot access it; the school has a separate entrance and separate elevators.

The curriculum incorporates internships and other real-world experiences with downtown businesses, organizations and facilities. Local college students and library staff augment the faculty by mentoring students and teaching them research skills. Students choose one of the school's two pre-professional pathways: biomedical health or digital media. Students can graduate with both a high school diploma and a community college degree.

The school does not have a sports program, although it does have exercise facilities, and there is some access to outdoor activities at nearby Petco Park.

References

External links
School website

Charter high schools in California
High schools in San Diego
2013 establishments in California